John Alexander Clowes (December 15, 1921 – February 13, 1978) was a professional American football player for the All-America Football Conference's Brooklyn Dodgers and Chicago Hornets as well as the National Football League's New York Yanks. He played between 1948 and 1951 after his collegiate career at William & Mary. He died on February 13, 1978, at his home in Norfolk, Virginia.

References

1921 births
1978 deaths
American football guards
American football tackles
Brooklyn Dodgers (AAFC) players
Chicago Hornets players
New York Yanks players
William & Mary Tribe football players
Sportspeople from Williamsburg, Virginia
Players of American football from Norfolk, Virginia